Felix von Leitner, nicknamed Fefe, is a German IT security expert living in Berlin. He is the main author of the dietlibc, a C standard library. His personal blog posts have received larger media coverage in Germany.

Biography 
In 2006, he analysed disadvantages of the planned "Gesundheitskarte" (health card).

Following a debate on the notability of his blog in the German Wikipedia, a controversial debate on notability in Wikipedia was started.

He played a crucial role in distributing videos of a case of abusive policing on the 2009 Freiheit statt Angst ("Freedom instead of fear") demonstration, that in the end led to the obligation of the Berlin police to wear identification badges.

In 2011, prior to the publication of Mac OS X Lion, he accused Apple of doing too little for its security.

Felix von Leitner was a long term member of the Chaos Computer Club Berlin (CCC).

References

External links 

 
Official blog 
alternativlos.org - podcast 

Living people
German computer programmers
Free software programmers
German bloggers
1973 births
German male writers
Members of Chaos Computer Club
Male bloggers